56P/Slaughter–Burnham is a periodic comet in the Solar System with a period of 11.54 years.

It was discovered in 1959 by Charles D. Slaughter and Robert Burnham of the Lowell Observatory, Flagstaff, Arizona during a photographic survey. They spotted the comet, with a faint brightness of magnitude 16, on a plate exposed on 10 December 1958. By monitoring its movement over a series of consecutive days, Elizabeth Roemer was able to calculate its orbit, suggesting a perihelion date of 4 August 1958 and an orbital period of 11.18 years.

It was subsequently observed in 1970, 1981, 1993, 2005 and 2016. Its next perihelion will be on December 19, 2027.

References

External links 
 Orbital simulation from JPL (Java) / Horizons Ephemeris
 56P/Slaughter-Burnham – Seiichi Yoshida @ aerith.net

Periodic comets
0056
Comets in 2016
19590127